International notation may mean:
FDI World Dental Federation notation
Hermann–Mauguin notation
Decimal_mark#Influence_of_calculators_and_computers - the use of the decimal point as the decimal mark